NGC 4388 is an active spiral galaxy in the equatorial constellation of Virgo. It was discovered April 17, 1784 by Wilhelm Herschel. This galaxy is located at a distance of 57 million light years and is receding with a radial velocity of 2,524 km/s. It is one of the brightest galaxies of the Virgo Cluster due to its luminous nucleus.

The NGC 4388 galaxy has been assigned a morphological class of SA(s)b, which indicates it is a spiral with no central bar (SA) or inner ring structure (s), and has moderately-wound spiral arms (b). It is inclined at an angle of 79° to the line of sight from the Earth and thus is being viewed from nearly edge-on. The major axis of the elliptical profile is aligned with a position angle of 92°.

The interstellar medium of the galaxy has recently undergone a stripping event due to ram pressure, causing star formation to steeply decline some  Myr ago. The galaxy may have passed close to the cluster center around 200 Myr ago, which led to the loss of much of its neutral hydrogen from interaction with the inter-cluster medium.

This is a classic Type 2 Seyfert galaxy where the emission from the active galactic nucleus is being concealed by a torus of obscuring gas and dust. These flows have a mean velocity of ·s−1.

Gallery

References

External links 
 

Unbarred spiral galaxies
Seyfert galaxies
Virgo Cluster
4388
Virgo (constellation)
040581